World Cup Trophy may refer to:

 Cricket World Cup Trophy
 FIFA World Cup Trophy in association football
 Naismith Trophy for the FIBA World Cup in basketball
 Webb Ellis Cup, the trophy of the Rugby World Cup (rugby union)

See also 
 List of world sports championships
 World Cup (disambiguation)
 World Team Cup (disambiguation)